Hillol Kargupta is an academic, scientist, and entrepreneur.

He is a co-founder and President of Agnik, a data analytics company for connected cars and Internet of Things. He also serves as the chairman of the board for KD2U, an organization for promoting research, education, and practice of data analytics in distributed and mobile environments. He was a professor of computer science at the University of Maryland, Baltimore County from until July, 2014.

Kargupta received his PhD. in Computer Science from University of Illinois at Urbana-Champaign, USA in 1996. Kargupta received his master's degree (M. Tech.) from Indian Institute of Technology Kanpur, India and undergraduate degree (B.Tech) from Regional Engineering College Calicut, India. After finishing his PhD in 1995, Kargupta joined the Los Alamos National Laboratory as a post-doctoral researcher and then as a full technical staff member. He joined the Electrical Engineering and Computer Science Department of Washington State University in 1997 as an assistant professor. In 2001 Kargupta joined the Computer Science and Electrical Engineering Department of the University of Maryland at Baltimore County (UMBC). He spent 13 years at the UMBC and became a full professor in 2009. In 2008, he also founded the Society for Knowledge Discovery in Distributed and Ubiquitous (KD2U) Environments. He currently serves as the President of Agnik.

Awards 
IEEE 10-Year Highest Impact Paper award.
 SIAM (Society of Industrial and Applied Mathematics) annual best student paper award, 1996.

References

External links
Agnik mines data from vehicles
UBI Going Mainstream?
 Kargupta talk at the ACM SIGKDD Conference
 Halmstad Colloquium - Big Data Analytics for Connected Cars

Living people
1967 births
People from Darjeeling
Indian computer scientists
National Institute of Technology Calicut